The 1979 Brown Bears football team was an American football team that represented Brown University during the 1979 NCAA Division I-A football season. Brown tied for second place in the Ivy League. 

In their seventh season under head coach John Anderson, the Bears compiled a 6–3 record and outscored opponents 197 to 129. J. Hickey and J. Sinnott were the team captains. 

The Bears' 5–2 conference record tied for second in the Ivy League standings. They outscored Ivy opponents 159 to 102. 

Brown played its home games at Brown Stadium in Providence, Rhode Island.

Schedule

Roster

References

Brown
Brown Bears football seasons
Brown Bears football